Keywell is a surname. Notable people with the surname include: 

Brad Keywell (born 1969), American businessman
Harry Keywell (1910–1997), American criminal, member of Detroit's Purple Gang